Skating's Next Star is a reality television show that began airing on the WE tv on April 26, 2006.

Premise
Twelve Professional Skaters competed for the first place prize $25,000, a feature article in International Figure Skating Magazine and a one year contract management contract with Major League Figure Skating. The show gained notoriety on the Today (NBC program) show which featured Natalia Kanounnikova setting the Guinness World Records for being the fastest spinner on ice. She set the record in episode 2. The Series was created by CEO of Major League Figure Skating and Former United States Figure Skating Judge, Jon Rubin.

Cast
The show is hosted by Olympic Gold Medalist, Kristi Yamaguchi. The Judges are Olympic Silver Medalist Elvis Stojko, Double Olympic Gold Medalist Oksana Grishuk and World Bronze Medalist, Rudy Galindo.

Men skaters
 Sergey Meller, West Townsend, MA
 Scott Corbin, Clinton Township, MI
 Emanuele Ancorini, New York, NY
 Chris Thombs, Portsmouth, RI
 Eric Bohnstedt, Orlando, FL
 Dusty Brinsmade, Detroit, MI

Ladies skaters
 Natalia Kanounnikova, Florida
 Kristin Dority, Providence, RI
 Kristen Treni, Punta Gorda, FL
 Ashley Clark, Colorado
 Natalie Mecher, Vernon Hills, IL
 Jessica Meller, West Township, MA

Episodes

References

External links 
 Skating's Next Star on IMDb
 Major League Figure Skating

2006 American television series debuts
2006 American television series endings
2000s American reality television series
Figure skating on television
Figure skating in the United States